In philately, an omnibus issue is an issue of stamps by several countries with a common subject and which may share a uniform design. Omnibus issues have often been made by countries under common political control or groups of colonies due to the close co-operation required to produce the issue. Omnibus issues are to be distinguished from joint issues which are usually much smaller in scope.

The first omnibus issue 
The first omnibus has been said to be the issue of 1898 by the Portuguese colonial empire to commemorate the quatercentenary of Vasco de Gama's discovery of the sea route to India.

British Empire and British Overseas Territories issues 
Omnibuses have been particularly associated with stamps from the former British Empire, now the British Commonwealth, due to the large number of territories participating. Initially designs were identical for each colony with only the values, colours and colony names varying. Over time, however, a wider range of designs has been used within the same issue. The first issue was the Silver Jubilee issue of 1935. Many others have followed, usually on themes related to the British Royal Family, but also for subjects such as Freedom from Hunger (1963) and the 1966 Football World Cup. Not every colony necessarily participates in every issue, although the revenue produced by the stamps is a valuable source of income for many smaller colonies/countries which may have few other ways of raising funds.

A list of British Omnibus issues is given below:

1935 - Silver Jubilee

1937 - Coronation   

1945-1946 - Peace and Victory

1948-1949 - Silver Wedding   

1949 - Universal Postal Union   

1951 - University

1953 - QEII Coronation   

1953 - Royal Visit

1958 - West Indies Federation   

1963 - Freedom From Hunger

1963 - Red Cross Centenary

1964 - Shakespeare

1965 - International Telecommunication Union

1965 - International Cooperation

1966 - Churchill Memorial

1966 - Football World Cup

1966 - U.N.E.S.C.O Issue

1966 - World Health Organisation

1966 - Royal Visit to the Caribbean

1972 - Royal Silver Wedding

1973 - Royal Wedding Princess Anne

1974 - Churchill Centenary

1977 - Royal Silver Jubilee

1978 - 25th Anniversary of Queen Elizabeth's Coronation

1980 - Queen Mothers 80th Birthday

1981 - Charles and Diana Royal Wedding

1982 - Princess Diana 21st and other Birthdays

1985 - Life and Times of Elizabeth the Queen Mother

1990 - Queen Mother's 90th Birthday

1997 - Queen Elizabeth Golden Wedding

French omnibus issues 

1931 - Colonial Exposition

1937 - International Exposition in Paris

1938 - Pierre and Marie Curie

1939 - Rene Caillie

1939 - New York World's Fair

1939 - 150th Anniversary of the Revolution

1942 - Protection of the Infants

1942 - Colonial Education Fund

1944 - Marianne Red Cross

1945 - Felix Eboue

1946 - Victory Anniversary

1946 - Chad to the Rhine

1949 - UPU Anniversary

1950 - Tropical Medicine

1952 - Military Medals

1954 - Liberation Anniversary

Other omnibus issuers 
The omnibus remains popular with countries whose philatelic marketing is handled by the Inter-Governmental Philatelic Corporation as it enables those countries to market their stamps into the lucrative United States and European thematic stamp market by featuring subjects popular in those countries. These issues have, however, been criticised for not being relevant to the culture of the participating countries, for instance stamps featuring Disney characters issued by poor African countries.

Commercialisation 
While most earlier omnibus issues were genuine attempts to help a group of countries celebrate an anniversary or event, the fact that these became popular with stamp collectors tempted issuing authorities to bring out more stamps than would have otherwise been thought necessary. These were often heavily marketed.

See also
Colonial Exposition Issue
Coronation issue
Joint issue
Key type stamp

References 

Philatelic terminology
Postage stamps